Vincent Kendrick (March 18, 1952 – March 21, 2015) was an American former college and professional football player who was a running back in the National Football League (NFL) for two seasons during the 1970s.  Kendrick played college football for the University of Florida, and thereafter, he played professionally for the Atlanta Falcons and Tampa Bay Buccaneers of the NFL.

Early years 

Kendrick was born in Miami, Florida in 1952 to Green Lester and Pearlie Mae Kendrick.  He attended Miami Springs High School in Miami Springs, Florida, where he played high school football for the Miami Springs Golden Hawks.

College career 

Kendrick received an athletic scholarship to attend the University of Florida in Gainesville, Florida, where he played for coach Doug Dickey's Florida Gators football team from 1971 to 1973.  As a senior team captain in 1973, he rushed 127 times for 567 yards and five touchdowns.  In his three-year college career, he totaled 1,269 yards on 279 attempts in an injury-plagued career spent primarily blocking for tailback Nat Moore.

Kendrick graduated from the University of Florida with a bachelor's degree in broadcasting in 1980.

Professional career 

He sat out 1975 after suffering a knee injury in a preseason game against the New York Jets. One of many injured Falcons, he was left unprotected for the 1976 NFL Expansion Draft, and was selected by the Tampa Bay Buccaneers expansion team. In Tampa Bay, he found himself in competition with his Florida Gators successor, Jimmy DuBose, for the fullback spot on the Bucs' roster. He scored the Bucs' first franchise touchdown, in an exhibition game against the Falcons, but was never able to regain his pre-injury form and was released after the season opener against the Houston Oilers.

Life after the NFL 

Kendrick returned to Gainesville after his two seasons in the NFL, first as a graduate assistant for Florida Gators head coach Doug Dickey, and then as an assistant coach for new head coach Charley Pell, working with the Florida Gators running backs.  After his first wife died, Kendrick and his young son Vinnie briefly lived in the football dormitory.  Kendrick left coaching after the 1983 season, and eventually married his second wife, Altermease Kendrick, owner of My Choice Community Development, Inc.  He worked as the community service director for the city of Deerfield Beach, Florida.  Vince volunteers his wisdom and talent with his wife as they embark on starting a charter school (My Choice Academy) in Lake Park, Florida.  Together they have four children: Robert Sr., Paula (deceased 2014), Vinnie and Alexis. They also have seven grandchildren Brittany, Robert Jr., Devin, JeMiah, Jocelyn, Naima , and Caleb. Naima was one of the few grandchildren who spent time with him. He loved her and supported her through everything and was basically a 2nd dad to her.

Kendrick died on March 21, 2015 from cancer.

See also 

 Florida Gators football, 1970–79
 List of Florida Gators in the NFL Draft
 List of University of Florida alumni

References

Bibliography 

 Carlson, Norm, University of Florida Football Vault: The History of the Florida Gators, Whitman Publishing, LLC, Atlanta, Georgia (2007).  .
 Golenbock, Peter, Go Gators!  An Oral History of Florida's Pursuit of Gridiron Glory, Legends Publishing, LLC, St. Petersburg, Florida (2002).  .
 Hairston, Jack, Tales from the Gator Swamp: A Collection of the Greatest Gator Stories Ever Told, Sports Publishing, LLC, Champaign, Illinois (2002).  .
 McCarthy, Kevin M.,  Fightin' Gators: A History of University of Florida Football, Arcadia Publishing, Mount Pleasant, South Carolina (2000).  .
 McEwen, Tom, The Gators: A Story of Florida Football, The Strode Publishers, Huntsville, Alabama (1974).  .
 Nash, Noel, ed., The Gainesville Sun Presents The Greatest Moments in Florida Gators Football, Sports Publishing, Inc., Champaign, Illinois (1998).  .

1952 births
2015 deaths
Miami Springs Senior High School alumni
Players of American football from Miami
African-American players of American football
American football running backs
Florida Gators football players
Atlanta Falcons players
Tampa Bay Buccaneers players
African-American coaches of American football
Coaches of American football from Florida
Florida Gators football coaches
20th-century African-American sportspeople
21st-century African-American people
Sports coaches from Miami